Oladapo Daniel Oyebanjo (born 9 June 1980), better known by his stage name D'banj, is a Nigerian singer and rapper and the founder of Mo' Hits Records with producer Don Jazzy. He has won several music awards, including the awards for Best African Act at the MTV Europe Music Awards 2007, Artist of the Year at the MTV Africa Music Awards 2009, Best International Act: Africa at the 2011 BET Awards, and Best-selling African Artist at the 2014 World Music Awards, Evolution award at the 2015 MTV Africa Music awards

Oyebanjo adopted the stage name D'banj, a combination of his first name, Dapo, and his surname, Oyebanjo. D'banj is best known internationally for his 2012 summer hit "Oliver Twist", an uptempo dance fusion of Afrobeats and electronic dance music that topped the African charts in 2011 and was a top 10 hit in the UK singles chart in 2012 reaching No. 2 on the UK R&B chart. He said the year 2021 would be marked in Grand styles and he would release his album tittled "Ikebe" before the end of the first quarter.

Early life 
D'banj, also known as the Kokomaster or Bangalee, was born on 9 June 1980 in Zaria, the northern part of Nigeria, to a military officer who commanded an artillery regiment and a devout church dignitary businesswoman who hailed from Shagamu in Ogun State. Dbanj has twins as siblings, Taiwo and Kehinde Oyebanjo.

Musical beginning 
D'banj was introduced to the harmonica by his late older brother, Femi Oyebanjo, who died in a plane crash at age seventeen. With D'banj's love for music being greater than his parents' military aspirations, he struggled for his parents' approval; this can be best heard through an album track, All Da Way from his debut album.

Following the death of his 17-year-old brother, D'banj arranged all his possessions on his bed after they were brought home and just picked up his harmonica. "I'd play it to remember him." Later, at university, he realised the potential of his new skills with the instrument. "I'd go to the female hostel after lectures, and even if there was no electricity I could play there." He remembers learning Celine Dion's "My Heart Will Go On" after Titanic came out – "and that got me a lot of girls!"

D'banj then proceeded to study mechanical engineering at the Lagos State University, but due to the constant strikes and several irregularities in the school he decided to withdraw.
Plans to continue his studies as a mechanical engineer in London were derailed when he arrived in the UK in 2001, and met Don Jazzy who was trying for a breakthrough as a songwriter and producer. D'Banj started hanging around the studio, making ends meet while working as a security guard. "It was OK, because I did nights," he says, "so I could listen to music on my headphones."

Don Jazzy told Kokomaster he thought he was a star in the making, and sensing that the music scene in Nigeria was "blossoming," the pair returned to Lagos in 2005. That same year came the single "Tongolo"; the video was paid for by D'Banj's mother. It became an instant hit and gained wide acclaim across the country. His first endorsement was with an energy drink called Power Fist.

Music career 
As a tribute to his mentor Fela, D'banj uses a fusion of Afrobeat and Afropop to bring his music to life and into the 21st century with breathless enthusiasm as well as a good dose of humour. Delivered in a humoristic way, his music usually carries a deeper message often addressing the struggles of a young Nigerian chasing their dreams. He performs in Yoruba, English and Pidgin English.

2005: No Long Thing 
D'banj's debut album, No Long Thing, was released in 2005. It yielded several singles with Tongolo as the lead single. This proved to be his breakthrough single and a hit. It also provided his Koko Master persona, with the term, koko, taking on a variety of meanings. D'banj's debut success led to collaborations with other artists, including Dare Art Alade and Ikechukwu. D'Banj's single koko was used by the PDP (ruling political party in Nigeria) as its campaign theme for the 2007 general elections.

2006: Rundown Funk U Up 
D'banj's second album Rundown Funk U Up, which was released in 2006, yielded several singles including the club single, Tongolo (Remix), and the lead single Why Me?. This proved to be another hit.

2007–2008: Curriculum Vitae & The Entertainer 
D'banj, as an artist of Mo'Hits Records,

is also a member of its collective group, Mo' Hits Allstars (includes artists Dr SID, Wande Coal, KaySwitch, and D'Prince). He has once been spotted with one of Nigeria's most talented singers, "Smile Lasisi". The collective's debut album, Curriculum Vitae, was released in December 2007. It included hit singles, "Be Close To You", "Booty Call" and "Move Your Body", which was the lead single.
D'banj was featured in Ikechukwu's 2008 hit, "Wind Am Well".

July 2008 saw the release of D'banj's third album, The Entertainer, with the singles "Gbono Feli Feli", "Kimon", "Olorun Maje" and "Entertainer".

Mo'Hits/G.O.O.D. Music 
In June 2011, D'banj was signed to Kanye West G.O.O.D Music record label as an artiste. On 9 June 2011, D'banj wrote on his Twitter account, @iamdbanj, "Just like yesterday, myself and my brother did Tongolo. 7 years later, Mo'Hits signs with GOOD Music. Best Birthday gift ever. God thank you."

In September 2016, it was announced D'banj was released from GOOD Music.

Mo'Hits break-up 
After several months of speculation and wild rumors, ace producer, Don Jazzy confirmed via his Twitter account the break-up of Mo'Hits. After the break-up, Don Jazzy, D'Prince, Dr SID, Wande Coal started Mavin Records while D'banj founded DB Records and as expected, he signed his younger brother Kayswitch to the label alongside two producers, Jaysleek and Deevee.

Sony Entertainment Deal 
In December 2012, D'banj signed a mega deal with Sony. Speaking on the importance of the deal to Sony, the managing director of Sony Music Entertainment, Sean Watson, said: "Partnering with D'Banj is a seminal event for us at Sony Music Entertainment Africa. We've always admired his talent and to be able to assist with bringing D'Banj's music to millions of fans, established and new, across the continent is an honour for us. We are very excited about being a part of it."

The deal was described as a "Pan African, multi-album deal with Sony Music's RCA Records. It also involves an exclusive management deal with Sony Music and strategic partner ROCKSTAR4000 for the continent. Add to that a multi-album, worldwide exclusive contract with emerging Nigerian singer-songwriter star Kayswitch and a strategic partnership with D'Banj's Nigerian record label  DB Records".

2014 
The forthcoming single "Bother You", inspired by the film Half of a Yellow Sun, was released on 7 April 2013, by Mi7 Records and D'banj's label DKM Media.
In June 2014, D'banj introduced artists under his record label, which includes him, younger brother Kay Switch, brothers MossKriss and Ralph Kriss and Tonto Dikeh, Ebeneztizzy.

2017 
He released the album titled King Don Come, with guest features from the likes of Gucci Mane, Wande Coal, Harry Songs, Bucie, Busiswa etc. in August. The album includes singles 'It's Not A Lie', 'El Chapo as well as his 2012 mega hit 'Oliver Twist'.

Live performances 
He has performed at Femi Kuti's new Afrikan Shrine in Ikeja, Lagos as well as the Shrine Synchro System's regular London Night at Cargo. He performed at the Black President Concert in memory of Fela's art and legacy at the Barbican in London, and also alongside many international artists in Nigeria like Kelly Rowland at the 1st Edition of the MTV Africa Music Awards 2008 in Abuja, Nigeria.
D'banj is a regular performer for the annual ThisDay Africa Rising Music Festival.

He was involved in one of the most anticipated events of the season, 'Koko Concert'. This concert consisted of D'Banj, Don Jazzy, Dr SID, Wande Coal, D'Prince plus a few guest appearances including May7ven and comedian Tunde Ednut. The stage was set for a thrilling night – the Koko effect is definitely LIVE in London as fans of D'Banj and Mo' Hits filled the O2 arena to capacity. As expected, the hits just kept coming and the momentum was sustained with on-stage antics from all the artists. In December 2010, the Mo' Hits All Stars brought Koko Concert to Lagos and D'banj kept belting out energetic performances that kept the audience screaming. Colleagues like M.I, eLDee, Jesse Jagz, and Wizkid also joined up on stage. There was also a global premiere of the highly anticipated "Mr Endowed (Remix)" featuring Snoop Dogg and also a recent track "Blame It on the Money" featuring the Californian native and Big Sean.

On 23 June 2012, D'banj performed at the Hackney Weekend to celebrate the 2012 Summer Olympics, which was headlined by Jay-Z and Rihanna. He performed alongside his friend, and fellow Universal Music Group label mate, Rita Ora on 30 August 2012 at the SCALA London Live Music, Clubs and Arts Venue to celebrate the release of her debut album Ora. He also performed at the AFCON 2013 closing ceremony held in South Africa. On 18 April 2015, D'banj performed at the Global citizen earth day a Free Concert on Capitol Hill (Washington Monument Grounds) for the 45th Anniversary of Earth Day put on by Global Poverty Project and the Earth Day Network.

Endorsements 
With D'banj's first album came his first endorsement from an energy drink called Power Fist. In May 2013, D'banj was named the Bank of Industry (BOI) ambassador. In November 2013, D'banj re-signed a multi-million Naira deal with Globacom, the company he parted ways with in 2010. In June 2014 D'Banj Secures Deal With Heritage Bank. In October 2014, D'banj was named the official African ambassador for Beats by Dre. In February 2015, D'banj was named the official African ambassador for Ciroc Nigeria. In an exclusive story on Tush Magazine Issue 11, Banky W and Dbanj shed more lights on how they became Ciroc Ambassadors. In September 2015, D'banj was made the brand ambassador of SLOT, a popular mobile phone, and electronic gadget retail outfit. Dbanj is now among the richest Afrobeats artists in Nigeria.

Humanitarian work 
D'banj is the founder of Koko Foundation for Youth and Peace Development. He was also Nigeria's first United Nations Youth Ambassador for Peace.  Dbanj is a ONE campaign ambassador; he released the song "Cocoa Na Chocolate" in support of agriculture investments. 'Cocoa Na Chocolate' featured 18 other African artists and won Best African Collaboration at the All Africa Music Awards in 2014.

In 2015, he was applauded by World Bank Chief, Jim Yong Kim for using his music power and high celebrity status to bringing attention to serious and critical issues in Africa with special focus on agriculture and poverty alleviation. Jim Yong Kim was quoted saying that "I had the pleasure of meeting D'banj last month and seeing him perform. I'm thrilled he is the first artists to take part in our new Music4Dev series encouraging global artist to raise awareness about poverty and related issues."

In 2015 D'banj released the video to "Extraordinary" to raise awareness on gender equality and women's empowerment. World bank endorsed the song as a song for women awareness.

Projects 
D'Banj is vastly immersed in the information technology, particularly in the areas of value-added services and Content digital distribution. He owns MCOMM Ltd (Median Mobile Communications Limited, A Value Added Service Content Provider) and D' Kings Men Media Limited (a 360 Media Company), which are responsible for his major digital moves in recent times.

C.R.E.A.M 
In August 2016, D'banj's D'Kings Men Media partnered with MTN Nigeria and the Bank of Industry to launch THE CREAM PLATFORM, a creative talent platform that was set up to help discover young creative minds across Nigeria by just dialing a USSD code on a mobile phone. It is reported that the platform, as at December 2016, had over 2 million paying subscribers and has discovered hundreds of talents from the music category alone, with tens of music videos and millions of NairaDUCTOR SETT given out to winners.

Personal life 
D'banj married Lineo Didi Kilgrow in June 2016. He announced the birth of their son, Daniel Oyebanjo III, in May 2017; the child drowned in June 2018.

In June 2020, after D'banj had posted to social media to "say no to rape," Seyitan Babatayo accused him of raping her in 2018, saying she wanted to "[call] him out on his hypocrisy." Shortly thereafter she went missing for two days, and while she was missing posts made to her social media said the allegations had been a publicity stunt to support an upcoming D'banj single. According to The Guardian, she was found with help from the NGO Stand to End Rape (STER). She said she'd been abducted by Nigerian police, who turned her over to D'banj's management team who co-opted her social media and made the retraction posts. D'banj denied the accusations, calling them "false allegations and lies from the pit of hell." After several days Babatayo issued a statement saying she and D'banj had agreed upon a "non-monetary" settlement, saying, "I just want my peace."

On 3 July 2020, D'banj sued Babatayo for N1.5 billion. Shortly thereafter, D'banj's former manager Franklin Amudo reported that Babatayo had told him D'banj had raped her the day after the alleged rape.

The 40-year-old songwriter spoke during his appearance at 'Bliss Experience', a church event hosted by Moses Bliss, a music artist.

In June 2018, Dbanj and Lineo Didi Kilgrow, his wife, mourned the loss of Daniel Oyebanjo III, their one-year-old son. The toddler was reported at the time to have drowned in the pool in the singer's home in Ikoyi, Lagos.

Recalling the tragic incident, Dbanj said God has replenished him by blessing him with not one but two children.

"What I was trying to say is that I'm actually born again. When I said Jesus is the koko, I meant it. If anybody knows my story, for every one of my album, I always give honour to whom honour is due," he can be heard saying.

"I always know the source of where I stand. Three years ago, I lost my first son. But the Lord restored me. There are things you would say to people and they won't relate because they believe you don't know what they're through.

"But God will put you through some journey so that you stand…[inaudible] Thank you so much. God bless you."

Discography

Albums

Singles

Guest appearances

Videography

Awards and nominations

See also 

 List of Nigerian musicians
 African hip hop
 Nigerian hip hop
 BET Awards of 2011

References

External links 
 
 D'banj Bio Page

 
Nigerian male rappers
Nigerian songwriters
Nigerian pop singers
1980 births
Living people
Nigerian male musicians
Yoruba musicians
People from Zaria
GOOD Music artists
Nigerian hip hop singers
21st-century Nigerian musicians
The Headies winners
Nigerian music industry executives
English-language singers from Nigeria
Yoruba-language singers
World Music Awards winners
Yoruba businesspeople
21st-century Nigerian businesspeople
MTV Europe Music Award winners